Proverbial Reggae was the second album by Jamaican Roots Reggae band The Gladiators, recorded and released in 1978 on Virgin Records' Front Line imprint. 

British dub poet Linton Kwesi Johnson has said the songs on Proverbial Reggae  "combine intelligent, poetic lyrics with majestic melodies, enchanting harmonies, producing inspired, entertaining meaningful music."

Track listing
All songs by Albert Griffiths unless noted.

Side One

 "Jah Works" - 3.30
 "The Best Things in Life" - 4.02
 "Dreadlocks the Time is Now" - 3.03
 "Fly Away" - 3.45
 "Marvel Not" - 3.54 (Clinton Fearon)

Side Two

 "Stick a Bush" - 2.27
 "Stop Before You Go" - 3.00
 "Can You Imagine How I Feel" - 4.10 (Clinton Fearon)
 "We'll Find the Blessing" - 3.02
 "Music Makers from Jamaica" - 3.40

Personnel
"Prince" Tony Robinson - Producer
Albert Griffiths - Lead Guitar, Vocals
Clinton Fearon - Bass Guitar, Vocals
Gallimore Sutherland - Rhythm Guitar, Vocals 
Lloyd Parks - Bass
"Sly" Dunbar - Drums
Uziah "Sticky" Thompson
Ansel Collins - Keyboards
Earl "Wire" Lindo - Synthesizer
Errol Thompson - Engineer
Joe Gibbs - Mixing
Cooke Key - Sleeve

References

External links
Proverbial Reggae, Roots Archives

1978 albums
The Gladiators (band) albums